Tenterhooks or tenter hooks are hooked nails in a device called a tenter. Tenters were wooden frames which were used as far back as the 14th century in the process of making woollen cloth. They are now superceeded by stenter pins.

The phrase "on tenterhooks" has become a metaphor for nervous anticipation.

Cloth-making 

After a piece of cloth was woven, it still contained oil and dirt from the fleece. A craftsman called a fuller (also called a tucker or wa(u)lker, in Scots, from the word 'Walker', as used in most of the UK mainland), cleaned the woollen cloth in a fulling mill, and then had to dry it carefully, to prevent the woollen fabric from shrinking. To prevent this shrinkage, the fuller would place the wet cloth on a large wooden frame, called a tenter, and leave it to dry outdoors. The lengths of wet cloth were stretched on the tenter using tenterhooks (hooked nails whose long shank was driven into the wood) all around the perimeter of the frame to which the cloth's edges (selvedges) were fixed, so that as it dried the cloth would retain its shape and size. 

There were tentergrounds (or tenter-fields), large open spaces full of tenters, wherever cloth was made, and as a result the word "tenter" is found in place names throughout the United Kingdom and its empire, for example several streets in Spitalfields, London and Tenterfield House in Haddington, East Lothian, Scotland, which in turn gave its name to Tenterfield in New South Wales, Australia.

The word tenter is still used today to refer to production line machinery employed to stretch polyester films and similar fabrics. The spelling stenter is also found.

Metaphor 

By the mid-18th century, the phrase on tenterhooks came to mean being in a state of tension, uneasiness, anxiety, or suspense, i.e., figuratively stretched like the cloth on the tenter.

John Ford's 1633 play Broken Heart contains the lines: "There is no faith in woman. Passion, O, be contain'd! My very heart-strings Are on the tenters."

In 1690 the periodical The General History of Europe used the term in the modern sense: "The mischief is, they will not meet again these two years, so that all business must hang upon the tenterhooks till then."

In 1826, English periodical Monthly magazine or British register of literature, sciences, and the belles-lettres contained the line "I hope (though the wish is a cruel one) that my fair readers, if any such readers have deigned to follow me thus far, are on tenterhooks to know to whom the prize was adjudged." In a letter to his wife the same year, American educator Francis Wayland (waiting for his promised appointment as President of Brown University) wrote "I was never so much on tenter hooks before."

References 

Textile arts
Metalworking